Lahkar is a surname of Hindus belonging to the state of Assam in North East India.

Notable people with the surname include:

Surname
Achyut Lahkar, a mobile theatre veteran of Assam, India
Bibhuti Lahkar, an Assamese conservationist and ecologist